Hlubočepy is a cadastral district of Prague, Czech Republic. In 2015 it had 22,466 inhabitants.

In this cadastral district lies a neighbourhood called Barrandov which is famous for its film studios (Barrandov Studios). The studios are now often called the "European Hollywood" or "Hollywood of the East" because of the increasing interest of western productions (such as the movies Mission Impossible, The Bourne Identity, Casino Royale, Prince Caspian, and many others). The name Barrandov is derived from the fossil-rich rocks which were studied by the French geologist Joachim Barrande.

The German name of Hlubočepy is Kohlfelden.

References 

Districts of Prague